As the Earth Turns is a 1934 American pre-Code drama film directed by Alfred E. Green and starring Jean Muir and Donald Woods, based on a Pulitzer Prize-nominated best-selling novel by Gladys Hasty Carroll.

Plot
The episodic plot, involving three farm families and marked by the seasons within a little over one year, takes place in rural southern Maine.  The main character, Jen Shaw (Jean Muir), is a young woman who has primary responsibility for her family while her father Mark (David Landau) deals with the hardships of farming.  Despite such hardships and the complaints of her step-sister Margaret (Emily Lowry) and step-mother Cora (Clara Blandick), who dream of returning to city life, Jen seems largely satisfied with her life.  In contrast, Mill, the wife of Jen's unambitious uncle George (Arthur Hohl), is increasingly embittered by her unhappy marriage.

In the winter, a Polish immigrant family, the Jankowskis, arrive to take possession of a nearby farm, making a home in the barn.  Stan (Donald Woods), the family's eldest son, has given up a promising future as a musician to live in the country.  When the Jankowskis have a chance to move back to a city, Stan stays behind to continue farming.  He and Jen are attracted to each other, but she is reluctant to accept love and winds up rejecting his offer of marriage.

After a fire destroys Stan's barn, he returns to the city to make a living as a musician and agrees to take Margaret with him.  Resigned to a life of loneliness, Jan continues to care for her family, but at last Stan returns and the two embrace.

Cast

 Jean Muir as Jen
 Donald Woods as Stan
 Russell Hardie as Ed
 Emily Lowry as Margaret
 Arthur Hohl as George
 Dorothy Peterson as Mil
 David Landau as Mark
 Clara Blandick as Cora
 William Janney as Ollie
 Dorothy Appleby as Doris
 Sarah Padden as Mrs. Janowski
 Egon Brecker as Mr. Janowski
 David Durand as Manuel
 Wally Albright as John
 Georgie Billings as Junior

Reception
The film was considered a box office disappointment for Warner Bros, though it did receive some positive reviews.  In Vanity Fair, Helen Brown Norden commented, "There is a certain serious fidelity about the picture which makes it ring true. For almost the first time, you see a group of actors pretending to be farmers, and they actually manage to make it seem credible. You feel they know how to pitch hay and how to churn butter. Perhaps that should count for something."

The reviewer for the New York Sun was respectful and complimentary: "This studio [warner Brothers], more used to the quick tempo and hard rhythms of melodrama, has done a simple, honest job of work with the...new film. It is, especially for city dwellers hungry for a taste of the real country in the spring of the year, a picture to be seen and enjoyed. All the qualities of Mrs. Carroll's novel are in the picture."

References

External links
As the Earth Turns at Turner Classic Movies
As the Earth Turns at IMDB
Review of film at New York Times

1934 films
Films set in Maine
American drama films
1934 drama films
Warner Bros. films
Films directed by Alfred E. Green
American black-and-white films
1930s English-language films
1930s American films